Spencer Ketcham Turnbull (born September 18, 1992) is an American professional baseball pitcher for the Detroit Tigers of Major League Baseball (MLB). He made his MLB debut in 2018. On May 18, 2021, Turnbull threw a no-hitter against the Seattle Mariners.

Career
Turnbull attended Madison Central High School in Madison, Mississippi, and the University of Alabama, where he played college baseball for the Alabama Crimson Tide. He became Alabama's top starting pitcher in 2013. After the 2013 season, he played collegiate summer baseball with the Wareham Gatemen of the Cape Cod Baseball League.

The Detroit Tigers selected Turnbull in the second round, with the 63rd overall selection, of the 2014 MLB draft. He signed with the Tigers, receiving a $900,600 signing bonus. He began his professional career with the GCL Tigers, and after one start, was promoted to the Connecticut Tigers, where he finished the season, posting an 0–2 record and 4.45 ERA in 11 starts. He spent 2015 with the West Michigan Whitecaps where he was 11–3 with a 3.01 ERA and 1.35 WHIP in 22 starts. He missed most of the 2016 season due to a shoulder impingement. Turnbull began 2017 with the Lakeland Flying Tigers, compiling a 7–3 record and 3.05 ERA in 15 starts, and finished the season with the Erie SeaWolves where he pitched to an 0–3 record and 6.20 ERA in four starts.

The Tigers added him to their 40-man roster after the 2017 season. He returned to Erie in 2018. He started 13 games for the SeaWolves and then two games for the Toledo Mud Hens of the Class AAA International League, before the Tigers promoted him to the major leagues on September 11. He made his major league debut on September 14, pitching a 1-2-3 inning of relief with one strikeout against the Cleveland Indians. He finished 0–2 in 4 appearances for Detroit.

In 2019, Turnbull made the starting rotation out of spring training and earned his first MLB win on April 23. Turnbull went 3–17 in 30 starts on the season, with a 4.61 ERA and 146 strikeouts in  innings. His 17 losses led the major leagues. He also had the lowest run support of all qualifying major league starters, at just 2.65 runs per game.

On July 31, 2020, Turnbull earned the win in a 7–2 victory over the Cincinnati Reds. It was his first win in his last 19 starts, and his first-ever win at home following 18 previous starts at Comerica Park. Turnbull started 11 of the Tigers' 58 games during the 2020 season, compiling a 4–4 record with a 3.97 ERA and 51 strikeouts in  innings.

Turnbull did not make the Tigers opening day roster for the 2021 season, due to being placed on the non-baseball related (COVID-19) injured list. He returned to the rotation on April 21, and won his season debut against the Pittsburgh Pirates.

On May 18, 2021, Turnbull pitched the eighth no-hitter in Tigers history against the Seattle Mariners, recording nine strikeouts and two walks in a 5–0 win. It was the first no-hitter by a Tiger since Justin Verlander's in 2011.

On June 5, 2021, Turnbull was placed on the injured list with a right forearm strain, and was transferred to the 60-day injured list on July 7 after suffering a setback in his recovery. On July 20, 2021, it was announced that Turnbull would undergo Tommy John surgery, ending his season. In nine games with Detroit in 2021, he posted a 4–2 record and 2.88 ERA.  He sits on the Tigers' 60-day Injured List as of April 6, 2022.

Pitch selection
Turnbull throws a four-seam fastball and a tailing two-seam fastball, each averaging 94–95 MPH (topping out at 98 MPH), a slider averaging 86–87 MPH, a curveball at about 80–81 MPH, and a changeup at about 86–88 MPH. The slider has been his most effective pitch, yielding only a .202 batting-average-against over his career.

Personal life
Turnbull is the son of Jim and Missy Turnbull. Turnbull is a Christian.

See also
List of Major League Baseball no-hitters

References

External links

 

1992 births
Living people
Alabama Crimson Tide baseball players
Baseball players from Mississippi
Connecticut Tigers players
Detroit Tigers players
Gulf Coast Tigers players
Erie SeaWolves players
Lakeland Flying Tigers players
Major League Baseball pitchers
Mesa Solar Sox players
People from Madison, Mississippi
Salt River Rafters players
Toledo Mud Hens players
Wareham Gatemen players
West Michigan Whitecaps players